Doesburg is a municipality and a city in the eastern Netherlands in the province of Gelderland. The city is situated on the right bank of river IJssel, at the confluence of river Oude IJssel. The municipality of Doesburg is part of the Arnhem-Nijmegen agglomeration region.

History
Doesburg received city rights in 1237, this was one year later than the neighbouring town of Doetinchem. Because of its strategic position along the Oude IJssel and Gelderse IJssel, Doesburg has been an important fortified city for a long time. The fortification of the city made Doesburg an important economic and administrative city. The Martinikerk, the main church in Doesburg is 94 meters tall. For many reasons, many of which have to do with the IJssel decreasing in depth, the prosperity in Doesburg settled after the 15th century. Doesburg changed into a sleepy provincial town and so it would remain until after the second world war. The city was protected in 1974, designated as a historic town.

As Doesburg was officially a fortified city up to 1923, town extension was not possible. After the second world war the city was rapidly extended. In the fifties on the Eastern side of the city the borough Molenveld (= mill field) was built. At south of the Oude IJssel followed in the seventies and eighties the borough Beinum. Recently at south of Beinum the borough Campstede has been built. At the beginning of the 21st century the construction of a new area at the IJsselkade was started with 44 houses and 124 apartments designed by the Italian architect Adolfo Natalini. In 2007, construction of a hotel was started called "Noabers". After a few months the hotel went bankrupt, but was taken over and reopened a year later.

Tourism 

In the north of Doesburg there are several camp-sites where in the high season 4000 visitors stay each year. Also the historical inner city with several museums and many monuments draw thousands of tourists every year. Large tourist attractions are the Main court, the Doesburgse mustard factory and 'De Waag', which according to reports is the oldest public place in the Netherlands.

Industry 

On the north side of the city, parallel to N317, lies the company area called Verheullweg. Here the international transport company Rotra and the construction material manufacturer Ubbink are established. To the east of the borough Beinum, along the provincial road N338, are the company areas Beinum-Oost and Beinum-West. Here various small and large ventures were established, among which are the manufacturer/wholesale company of gedistilleerd (Delcave), a houtverwerkende company (Aalbers), a plastic company (Dremefa) and a builder's company (Claus). Along the Gelderse Ijssel an iron foundry and a concrete call centre have been established, as well as, near the bridge, a builder of motor yachts.

Well-known Doesburgers 

 Peter of Dusburg (maybe 1260-1326) a Priest-Brother and chronicler of the Teutonic Knights
 Jan Hendrik van Kinsbergen (1735 in Doesburg – 1819) Count of Doggersbank, was a Dutch naval officer and sea hero
 Robert Jacob Gordon (1743 in Doesburg – 1795) explorer, soldier, artist, naturalist and linguist of Scottish descent
 Carel Hendrik Ver Huell (also Verhuell) (born 1764 in Doetinchem - 1845) a Dutch, and later French, admiral and statesman
 Johan Conrad van Hasselt (1797 in Doesburg – 1823) physician, zoologist, botanist and mycologist
 Willem Anne Schimmelpenninck van der Oye (1800 in Doesburg – 1872) politician
 Frederik Alexander Adolf Gregory (1814 in Doesburg – 1891) a Dutch Vice admiral
 Charles August Masse (born 1838 in Doesburg) a member of the Wisconsin State Assembly
 Theo Colenbrander (1841 in Doesburg – 1930) architect, ceramist, plaque painter and designer 
 Kees Luesink (1953–2014 in Doesburg) a Dutch politician, Mayor of Doesburg from 2008
 Elbert Roest (born 1954) a Dutch historian, politician and former teacher, Doesburg municipal councillor 1992 to 2002
 Clemens Cornielje (born 1958 in Lobith) politician and former political consultant and educator
 Agnes Kant (born 1967) a retired Dutch politician, lives in Doesburg

Gallery

References

External links 

 Official website
 many sourced quotes and facts of Theo van Doesburg in: De Stijl 1917-1931 - The Dutch Contribution to Modern Art, by H.L.C. Jaffé; J.M. Meulenhoff, Amsterdam 1956

 
Municipalities of Gelderland
Populated places in Gelderland
Cities in the Netherlands
Members of the Hanseatic League
Achterhoek